In molecular biology, Small nucleolar RNA psi28S-3316 is a member of the H/ACA class of snoRNA. This family is responsible for guiding the modification of uridine 3316 in Drosophila 28S rRNA to pseudouridine

References

External links 
 

Small nuclear RNA